The tuft-tailed spiny tree rat (Lonchothrix emiliae) is a spiny rat species from Brazil south of the Amazon River, where it has been found in grassland and gallery forest. It is the only species in the genus Lonchothrix.
Very little is known about this rodent. It is small with an average adult weight of about 138 grams. It is nocturnal and solitary in habits.

The genus and species were described by Oldfield Thomas in 1920.

Phylogeny
Lonchothrix is a member of the Echimyini clade of arboreal Echimyidae rodents. The closest relative of Lonchothrix is Mesomys, reflecting the fact that these taxa have once been classified in the same subfamily (Eumysopinae). These two genera share phylogenetic affinities with several taxa and clades: (i) Echimys, Phyllomys, Makalata, Pattonomys, and Toromys ; (ii) the bamboo rats Dactylomys, Olallamys, Kannabateomys together with Diplomys and Santamartamys ; and (iii) Isothrix.

References

Echimyidae
Mammals described in 1920
Taxa named by Oldfield Thomas